The Finding of the Body of Saint Mark or Discovery of the Body of Saint Mark is a painting by Tintoretto. Dated to between 1562 and 1566, it is part of a cycle of paintings of Saint Mark, the patron saint of Venice. It is now held in the Pinacoteca di Brera in Milan.

Description
The painting was commissioned by Tommaso Rangone, the “grand guardian” of the Scuola Grande di San Marco in Venice, from Tintoretto as part of a series of large canvases depicting Venice's acquisition of the body of Saint Mark.

The painting shows Venetians busily removing corpses from tombs along the right wall and from a crypt in the background. In the left foreground, Saint Mark surrounded by a faint halo appears and beseeches the Venetians to stop as his body has been found and lies pale at his feet, strewn on an oriental rug.  In the center of the canvas, an elder (portrait of Rangone) kneels, acknowledging the miracle. Elsewhere in the room, the figures are either astonished or oblivious to the apparition.

In places, the work appears unfinished (e.g. the tiles of floor and the cornices are still visible through some clothing and figures). The foreshortening is accentuated by the tiles, the wall tombs, and finally the rays of light that emerge from the crypt in the background. In the right foreground, a contorted half-naked man is described as "possessed by demons", and above him hover strands of smoke. 

Like its companion piece, Saint Mark's Body Brought to Venice, the composition exemplifies Tintoretto's preference for dramatic effects of perspective and light. According to the art historian Thomas Nichols, "the linear logic of the emptied, boxlike perspective vistas is undermined by an irrational play of light and shade. Both paintings suggest the simultaneous existence of different levels of reality through the use of a range of pictorial techniques."

According to art historian Augusto Gentili, the iconography of the painting suggests that it represents not the finding of the body of Saint Mark, but Miracles of Saint Mark in the church of Boucolis in Alexandria.

Notes

Sources
Gillo Dorfles, Stefania Buganza and Jacopo Stoppa, Arti visive. Dal Quattrocento all'Impressionismo, Atlas, 2001, page 262

External links

Paintings by Tintoretto
1560s paintings
Paintings in the collection of the Pinacoteca di Brera
Religious paintings
Paintings depicting Mark the Evangelist